This is a list of cases reported in volume 103 of United States Reports, decided by the Supreme Court of the United States in 1880 and 1881.

Justices of the Supreme Court at the time of volume 103 U.S. 

The Supreme Court is established by Article III, Section 1 of the Constitution of the United States, which says: "The judicial Power of the United States, shall be vested in one supreme Court . . .". The size of the Court is not specified; the Constitution leaves it to Congress to set the number of justices. Under the Judiciary Act of 1789 Congress originally fixed the number of justices at six (one chief justice and five associate justices). Since 1789 Congress has varied the size of the Court from six to seven, nine, ten, and back to nine justices (always including one chief justice).

When the cases in volume 103 U.S. were decided the Court comprised nine of the following ten members at one time (William Burnham Woods replaced William Strong in January 1881):

Notable Cases in volume 103 U.S.

Kilbourn v. Thompson 
Kilbourn v. Thompson, 103 U.S. 168 (1880) dealt with whether the United States House of Representatives may compel testimony. The Supreme Court held that the chamber has the power to punish persons for contempt if they refuse to obey a summons from the House.

Neal v. Delaware 
In Neal v. Delaware, 103 U.S. 370 (1881), the Supreme Court, with a majority opinion by Justice John Marshall Harlan, vacated the guilty verdict and death sentence on an African-American man accused of rape. In selecting persons to serve as jurors, no persons of color were in the jury pool, but rather were excluded because of their race though they were otherwise qualified. The Court held this to violate Neal's rights under the 14th Amendment. Neal was acquitted in a second trial that included black men in the jury pool but not on the trial jury. Neal has been cited by appellate courts more than 200 times, most recently in 2019 by the U.S. Supreme Court in Flowers v. Mississippi.

Citation style 

Under the Judiciary Act of 1789 the federal court structure at the time comprised District Courts, which had general trial jurisdiction; Circuit Courts, which had mixed trial and appellate (from the US District Courts) jurisdiction; and the United States Supreme Court, which had appellate jurisdiction over the federal District and Circuit courts—and for certain issues over state courts. The Supreme Court also had limited original jurisdiction (i.e., in which cases could be filed directly with the Supreme Court without first having been heard by a lower federal or state court). There were one or more federal District Courts and/or Circuit Courts in each state, territory, or other geographical region.

Bluebook citation style is used for case names, citations, and jurisdictions.
 e.g.,"C.C.D.N.J." = United States Circuit Court for the District of New Jersey
 e.g.,"D. Mass." = United States District Court for the District of Massachusetts
 "E." = Eastern; "M." = Middle; "N." = Northern; "S." = Southern; "W." = Western
 e.g.,"C.C.S.D.N.Y." = United States Circuit Court for the Southern District of New York
 e.g.,"M.D. Ala." = United States District Court for the Middle District of Alabama
 "Ct. Cl." = United States Court of Claims
 The abbreviation of a state's name alone indicates the highest appellate court in that state's judiciary at the time.
 e.g.,"Pa." = Supreme Court of Pennsylvania
 e.g.,"Me." = Supreme Judicial Court of Maine

List of cases in volume 103 U.S.

Notes and references

External links 
  Case reports in volume 103 from Library of Congress
  Case reports in volume 103 from Court Listener
  Case reports in volume 103 from the Caselaw Access Project of Harvard Law School
  Case reports in volume 103 from Google Scholar
  Case reports in volume 103 from Justia
  Case reports in volume 103 from Open Jurist
 Website of the United States Supreme Court
 United States Courts website about the Supreme Court
 National Archives, Records of the Supreme Court of the United States
 American Bar Association, How Does the Supreme Court Work?
 The Supreme Court Historical Society

1880 in United States case law
1881 in United States case law